Galadriel (IPA: [ɡaˈladri.ɛl]) is a character created by J. R. R. Tolkien in his Middle-earth writings. She appears in The Lord of the Rings, The Silmarillion, and Unfinished Tales.

She was a royal Elf of both the Noldor and the Teleri, being a grandchild of both King Finwë and King Olwë. She was also close kin of King Ingwë of the Vanyar through her grandmother Indis.
Galadriel was a leader during the rebellion of the Noldor, and present in their flight from Valinor during the First Age. Towards the end of her stay in Middle-earth, she was joint ruler of Lothlórien with her husband, Celeborn, when she was known as the Lady of Lórien, the Lady of the Galadhrim, the Lady of Light, or the Lady of the Golden Wood. Her daughter Celebrían was the wife of Elrond and mother of Arwen, Elladan, and Elrohir.
Tolkien describes Galadriel as "the mightiest and fairest of all the Elves that remained in Middle-earth" (after the death of Gil-galad) and the "greatest of elven women".

The Tolkien scholar Tom Shippey has written that Galadriel represented Tolkien's attempt to re-create the kind of elf hinted at by surviving references in Old English. He has compared his elves also to those in a Christian Middle English source, The Early South English Legendary, where the elves were angels. Another scholar, Marjorie Burns, compares Galadriel in multiple details to Rider Haggard's heroine Ayesha, and to Tennyson's The Lady of Shalott, both being reworked figures of Arthurian legend. Galadriel, lady of light, assisting Frodo on his quest to destroy the One Ring, opposed to Shelob, the giant and evil female spider of darkness, have been compared to Homer's opposed female characters in the Odyssey: Circe and Calypso as Odysseus's powerful and wise benefactors on his quest, against the perils of the attractive Sirens, and the deadly Scylla and Charybdis.

Modern songwriters have created songs about Galadriel; Tolkien's Quenya poem "Namárië" has been set to music by Donald Swann. Galadriel has appeared in both animated and live-action films and television. Cate Blanchett played her in Peter Jackson's film series, while Morfydd Clark played her in an earlier age in  The Lord of the Rings: The Rings of Power.

Fictional biography 

Stories of Galadriel's life prior to the War of the Ring appear in both The Silmarillion and Unfinished Tales. She was the only daughter and youngest child of Finarfin, prince of the Noldor, and of Eärwen, daughter of Olwë and cousin to Lúthien. Her elder brothers were Finrod Felagund, Angrod, and Aegnor. She was born in Valinor. She had the ability to peer into the minds of others to judge them fairly. She was a member of the royal House of Finwë. Galadriel was often called the fairest of all Elves, whether in Aman or Middle-earth.

According to the older account of her story, sketched by Tolkien in The Road Goes Ever On and used in The Silmarillion, Galadriel was an eager participant and leader in the rebellion of the Noldor and their flight from Valinor; she was the "only female to stand tall in those days". She had, however, long since parted ways with Fëanor and his sons. In Beleriand she lived with her brother Finrod Felagund at Nargothrond and the court of Thingol and Melian in Doriath. In this account, she met Celeborn, a kinsman of Thingol, in Doriath. She carried some dark secrets from those times; she told Melian part of the violent story of the Silmarils and Morgoth's killing of Finwë, but did not mention the kinslaying of elves by elves.

Second Age 

Galadriel and Celeborn travelled first to Lindon, where they ruled over a group of Elves, and were themselves ruled by Gil-galad. According to Concerning Galadriel and Celeborn, they then removed to the shores of Lake Nenuial (Evendim) and were accounted the Lord and Lady of all the Elves of Eriador. Later, they moved eastward and established the realm of Eregion (Hollin). They made contact with a Nandorin settlement in the valley of the River Anduin, which became Lothlórien. At some point, Celeborn and Galadriel left Eregion and settled in Lothlórien. According to some of Tolkien's accounts, they became rulers of Lothlórien for a time during the Second Age; but in all accounts they returned to Lórien to take up its rule after Amroth was lost in the middle of the Third Age.

Celeborn and Galadriel had a daughter, Celebrían, who married Elrond Half-elven of Rivendell.

During the Second Age, when the Rings of Power were forged, Galadriel distrusted Annatar, the loremaster who taught the craft of the Rings to Celebrimbor. Again according to some of the accounts, Celebrimbor rebelled against her view and seized power in Eregion. As a result, Galadriel departed to Lórien via the gates of Moria, but Celeborn refused to enter the dwarves' stronghold and stayed behind. Her distrust was justified, for Annatar turned out to be the Dark Lord, Sauron. When Sauron attacked Eregion, Celebrimbor entrusted Galadriel with Nenya, one of the Three Rings of the Elves. Celeborn joined up with Elrond, whose force was unable to relieve Eregion but managed to escape back to Imladris. Celeborn reunited with Galadriel when the war ended; according to one text, after some years in Imladris (during which Elrond first saw and fell in love with Celebrían) Galadriel's sea-longing became so strong that the couple removed to Belfalas and lived at the place later called Dol Amroth.

Third Age 

In The Fellowship of the Ring, Galadriel welcomed the Fellowship to Lothlórien after their escape from Moria. When she met the Fellowship in her tree-dwelling she gave each member a searching look, testing their resolve—though Boromir interpreted this test as a temptation. She was in turn tested when Frodo Baggins offered to place the Ring in her keeping. Knowing that its corrupting influence would make her "great and terrible", and recalling the ambitions that had once brought her to Middle-earth, she refused the Ring. She accepted that her own ring's power would fail, that her people would diminish and fade with the One Ring's destruction, and that her only escape from the fading of the Elves and the dominion of Men would be to return at last to Valinor. It is implied, backed up by other writings, that in acknowledgement of this renunciation of power her personal ban from Valinor was lifted.

When the Fellowship left Lothlórien, she gave each member a gift and an Elven cloak, and furnished the party with supplies, both as practical support and as a symbol of faith, hope and goodwill. Her husband Celeborn likewise provided the Fellowship with Elven-boats.
On the day that the Fellowship left Lórien, but unknown to them, Gandalf arrived, carried by the eagle Gwaihir. Galadriel healed his wounds and re-clothed him in white, signalling his new status as head of the Istari, the order of wizards. 

After Sauron perished, Celeborn led the host of Lórien across the Anduin and captured Dol Guldur. Galadriel came forth and "threw down its walls and laid bare its pits". She travelled to Minas Tirith for the wedding of her granddaughter Arwen to King Aragorn Elessar after the end of the war. Galadriel passed over the Great Sea with Elrond, Gandalf, and the Ring-bearers Bilbo and Frodo, marking the end of the Third Age. Celeborn remained behind, and Tolkien writes that "there is no record of the day when at last he sought the Grey Havens".

Characteristics 

However, Galadriel's most striking feature was her beautiful long silver-golden hair. The Elves of Tirion said it captured the radiance of the Two Trees Laurelin and Telperion themselves.

Fëanor greatly admired her hair; it may have inspired him to create the Silmarils.

Nevertheless, Galadriel never repaid Fëanor's admiration. Fëanor "had begged her thrice for a tress and thrice she refused to give him even one hair. It is said that these two kinsfolk, being considered the greatest of the Eldar of Valinor, remain unfriends forever."

Her character was a blend of characteristics of the Eldar from whom she was descended. She had the pride and ambition of the Noldor, but in her they were tempered by the gentleness and insight of the Vanyar.  She shared the latter virtues of character with her father Finarfin and her brother Finrod.

Her sympathy for Gimli the Dwarf in Lothlórien, (when she rebuked her husband Celeborn for being tempted to regret his decision to admit the Dwarf to that land), completely won him over.

Relationships

Analysis

Reconstructed Old English elf

The critic Tom Shippey notes that in creating Galadriel, Tolkien was attempting to reconstruct the kind of elf hinted at by elf references in Old English (Anglo-Saxon) words. The hints are, he observes, paradoxical: while ælfscyne, "elf-beautiful", suggests a powerful allure, ælfsogoða, "lunacy", implies that getting too close to elves is dangerous. In Shippey's view, Tolkien is telling the literal truth that "beauty is itself dangerous", as Chaucer did in The Wife of Bath's Tale where both elves and friars are sexually rapacious. So when Faramir says to Sam Gamgee in Ithilien that Galadriel must be "perilously fair", Shippey comments that this is a "highly accurate remark"; Sam replies that "folk takes their peril with them into Lorien... But perhaps you could call her perilous, because she's so strong in herself."

Angelic being

Shippey also considers the Christian Middle English attitude of the South English Legendary, a hagiographic work which he supposes Tolkien must have read, that elves were angels. In Shippey's view, Tolkien's elves are much like fallen angels, above Men but below the angelic Maiar and the godlike Valar. He comments at once that Galadriel is in one way certainly not "fallen", as the elves avoided the war on Melkor in the First Age; but all the same, "Galadriel has been expelled from a kind of Heaven, the Deathless land of Valinor, and has been forbidden to return." Shippey suggests that the Men of Middle-earth might have thought the fall of Melkor and the expulsion of Galadriel added up to a similar fallen status; and he praises Tolkien for taking both sides of the story of elves into account.

Arthurian figure

The Tolkien scholar Marjorie Burns compares Galadriel to Rider Haggard's heroine Ayesha in his 1887 novel She: A History of Adventure, a book that Tolkien acknowledged as an important influence, and to Tennyson's The Lady of Shalott, which recast the Arthurian legend of Elaine of Astolat; she notes that Ayesha was herself an Arthurian figure, transposed to 19th century Africa.

Homeric benefactor

The Tolkien scholar Mac Fenwick compares Galadriel and what he sees as her monstrous opposite, the giant and evil spider Shelob, with the struggle between the good and the monstrous female characters in Homer's Odyssey. Like Galadriel, Circe and Calypso are rulers of their own secluded magical realms, and both offer help and advice to the protagonist. They help Odysseus to avoid destruction by the female monsters, the Sirens who would lure his ship on to the rocks, and Scylla and Charybdis who would smash or drown his ship; Galadriel gives Frodo the Phial of Galadriel, which by her power contains the light of Eärendil's star, able to blind and ward off Shelob in her darkest of dark lairs. Galadriel's gifts, too, are Homeric, including cloaks, food, and wisdom as well as light, just like those of Circe and Calypso.

Legacy in music

Tolkien wrote a poem "Namárië" that Galadriel sings in farewell to the departing Fellowship, and to Frodo in particular.  The song is in Quenya, and "spoke of things little-known in Middle-earth," but Frodo is said to have remembered the words and translated them long afterward.  It is a lament in which Galadriel describes her separation from the Blessed Realm and the Valar, her longing to return there, and at the end a wish or hope that even though she herself is forbidden (by the Ban) to return, that Frodo might somehow come in the end to the city of Valimar in Valinor. The poem was set to music by Donald Swann with Tolkien's assistance. The sheet music and an audio recording are part of the song-cycle of The Road Goes Ever On. In a recording, Tolkien sings it in the style of a Gregorian chant. 

Galadriel's songs are omitted from Howard Shore's music for The Lord of the Rings film series; instead, Shore created a Lothlórien/Galadriel theme using the  Arabic maqam Hijaz scale to create a sense of antiquity.
Fran Walsh, Shore, and Annie Lennox co-wrote the Oscar-winning song "Into the West" for the closing credits of The Lord of the Rings: The Return of the King. Originally sung by Lennox, the song was conceived as Galadriel's bittersweet lament for those who have sailed across the Sundering Seas. The lyrics include phrases from the final chapter of the original novel. The song has since been covered by Yulia Townsend and Will Martin.

On their album Once Again, the band Barclay James Harvest featured a song called "Galadriel". It gained notability because guitarist John Lees played John Lennon's Epiphone Casino guitar on this track, an event later recounted in a song on the band's 1990 album Welcome To The Show titled "John Lennon's Guitar".
Hank Marvin and John Farrar wrote a song "Galadriel", recorded by Cliff Richard; the four five-line stanzas include the couplet "Galadriel, spirit of starlight / Eagle and dove gave birth to thee". An Australian band named Galadriel released a self-titled album in 1971 which "became a highly sought-after collectors' item among European progressive rock circles".

Adaptations

Galadriel was voiced by Annette Crosbie in Ralph Bakshi's 1978 animated film of The Lord of the Rings, and by Marian Diamond in BBC Radio's 1981 serialisation. 

In Peter Jackson's Lord of the Rings and The Hobbit trilogies, Galadriel is played by Cate Blanchett. In The Lord of the Rings: The Fellowship of the Ring, Galadriel narrates the prologue that explains the creation of the One Ring, as well as appearing in Lothlórien.

While Galadriel does not feature in Tolkien's The Hobbit, the story was amended so that she could appear in Jackson's films based on the book.

On stage, Galadriel was portrayed by Rebecca Jackson Mendoza in the 2006 Toronto musical production of The Lord of the Rings; Mendoza's dress was hand-embroidered with some 1800 beads. The musical was revised and moved to London's Theatre Royal, Drury Lane in 2007, with Laura Michelle Kelly in the "glittering" role. 

Galadriel appears in video games such as The Lord of the Rings: The Battle for Middle-earth II, where she is voiced by Lani Minella.

In the 2022 television series The Lord of the Rings: The Rings of Power, young Galadriel was portrayed by Morfydd Clark, and her younger version by Amelie Child Villiers.

Notes

References

Primary 
This list identifies each item's location in Tolkien's writings.

Secondary

Sources 

 
 
 
 
 

Characters in The Silmarillion
Female characters in film
Female characters in literature
Fictional lords and ladies
Fictional princesses
Fictional telepaths
High Elves (Middle-earth)
Literary characters introduced in 1954
The Lord of the Rings characters
Middle-earth rulers
Noldor
Ring-bearers
Teleri

de:Figuren in Tolkiens Welt#Galadriel und Celeborn